The men's 400 metre individual medley event at the 2022 Commonwealth Games was held on 30 July at the Sandwell Aquatics Centre. New Zealand's Lewis Clareburt won the event, from Australia's Brendon Smith and Scotland's Duncan Scott, setting a new Commonwealth record, Oceanian record, and New Zealand record. He also became the first New Zealand swimmer in 16 years since Moss Burmester did in 2006 to claim a Commonwealth gold medal.

Schedule
The schedule is as follows:

All times are British Summer Time (UTC+1)

Records
Prior to this competition, the existing world, Commonwealth and Games records were as follows:

The following records were established during the competition:

Results

Heats

Final

References

Men's 400 metre individual medley
Commonwealth Games